Al Huda Central School, commonly known as Al Huda Central School, Kadampuzha, is a Primary with Upper Primary and Secondary School in Marakkara Village of Kuttipuram. It was established in the year 1993 and the school management is Pvt. Unaided. It's an English Medium - Co-educational school. Institution was run by Majma-U-Thaskiyathil Islamiyya, Vettichira, is one of the premier English Medium Schools in Malappuarm District. It is situated in a serene land scaping and scenic surroundings at Malayil, about 11/2 km from Kadampuzha and Kanhippura (NH17), in an enchantingrural atmosphere, away from the din and bustle of the city life.

Since 1999 the school is affiliated to CBSE Delhi. It aims at the all-round development of the students by imparting modern and scientific education with special focus on character building, physical fitness, intellectual growth and the attainment of emotional balance. The motto of the school is "To Seek, To Strive, To find". Motive the young minds to seek, equip them to strive and guide them to find. The performance of the institution in academic and non-academic fields bears ample testimony to the school's commitment in this regard.

About

Al Huda Central School Kadampuzha has its own (private) building. The school has 27 classrooms. The lowest class is LKG and the highest class in the school is 10. This school has 10 Male Teachers and 29 Female Teachers. There is library facility available in this school.

This school also has a playground. Al Huda Central School Kadampuzha does not provide any residential facility.

References

External links
Official website of Al Huda Central School
Website of All India Facts
Official blog of Asif Kollerkuzhiyil

Primary schools in Kerala
High schools and secondary schools in Kerala
Schools in Malappuram district
Educational institutions established in 1993
1993 establishments in Kerala